Conotalis aurantifascia is a moth in the family Crambidae. It was described by George Hampson in 1896. It is found in Ghana, Nigeria, Sierra Leone and the Gambia.

References

Crambinae
Moths described in 1896